Stavernfestivalen is a yearly music festival held in Stavern, Norway at Larvik Golf Arena. The festival takes place in July, and in 2019 there were roughly 75 000 attendees over a three-day period.

The very first festival took place in 2001, lasting a single day with 175 attendees. In 2002 it expanded to two days, and this lasted until 2011, after which the festival increased to three days.

Relocation to the Larvik Golf Arena 
Up until 2014 the festival was arranged at Skråvika near Minnehallen in Stavern. In 2015 it relocated to the Larvik Golf Arena – a much larger, spacious area where the organizers could focus on further developing and improving the overall experience.

Camping and food services massively improved since the move. For example, in 2019 the campgrounds were able to support roughly 8 000 attendees and 26 food distributors in the festival arena.

International Artists 
Gradually the festival flourished from having almost exclusively Norwegian artists on the venue to becoming a festival of international proportions by having several world famous artists on stage. In recent times widely recognized names such as Travis Scott, Bob Dylan, Ed Sheeran, Elton John, Alan Walker, Neil Young, KYGO, Post Malone, David Guetta, Wiz Khalifa, Dua Lipa, Sigrid and Swedish House Mafia have all performed on the festival stage.

Martin Garrix and A$AP Rocky booked for Stavernfestivalen 2020 
So far A$AP Rocky, Martin Garrix, The 1975, Kamelen and Isah & Dutty Dior are all booked for the upcoming festival, set to take place July9th–11th in 2020 before being ultimately postponed for 2021 due to the ongoing COVID-19 pandemic.

Bands and artists

External links 

Music festivals in Norway
Rock festivals in Norway
2001 establishments in Norway
Music festivals established in 2001
Culture in Vestfold og Telemark